The Thing Which Solomon Overlooked 3 is the twelfth album by Japanese experimental band Boris. This is the third installment of the Thing Which Solomon Overlooked series and was released concurrently with the previous installment, The Thing Which Solomon Overlooked 2.

Like other albums in this series, The Thing Which Solomon Overlooked 3 is centered on drone music and retains the totally instrumental nature of the first volume. The release contains the song "No Ones Grieve Part 1" whose second part is found on the previous installment; other than the title, they appear to be unrelated. Compared to most of the band's discography, this series of albums contains primarily improvised music.

The album was pressed on vinyl and only 1000 copies were made. 700 copies pressed in orange vinyl were distributed by the label Conspiracy Records who was in charge of the release while the remaining 300 copies pressed in light blue vinyl were sold exclusively on tour. Much like the previous installments, the cover is very similar except for the change of font to blue (instead of orange or green used in the previous installments), the addition of the "3" to the title, and the position of the curtain on the right side which was modified slightly.

This album, along with all the other albums in the series, was remastered for the 2013 boxset The Thing Which Solomon Overlooked - Chronicle.

Track listing

Personnel

 Atsuo - Musician
 Takeshi - Musician
 Wata - Musician
 Produced by Boris
 Mastered by Souichirou Nakamura
 Recorded, mixed, and artwork by Fangs Anal Satan

Pressing History

References

External links
 

2006 albums
Boris (band) albums